Vũ Văn Thanh (born 14 April 1996) is a Vietnamese professional footballer who plays as a right-back for V.League 1 club Công An Hà Nội and the Vietnam national team.

Club career
Vũ Văn Thanh is a graduate of the HAGL–Arsenal JMG Academy. In 2015 season, Thanh was promoted to the first-team squad. He totalled 182 professional games for Hoang Anh Gia Lai and was Vietnamese Young player of the Year in 2016, also featuring in the Team of the Season for V.League 1 as many times.

In January 2023, Thanh signed for newly promoted V.League 1 side Hanoi Police FC.

International career
Vũ Văn Thanh played youth international football for the Vietnam at under-19, under-22 and under-23 levels. He was part of the squad that managed to reach the final of the 2018 AFC U-23 Championship after defeating Qatar in the semi-final. However, they finished runners-up to Uzbekistan.

On 24 March 2016, Thanh made his senior international debut against Chinese Taipei. He scored his first international goal on 6 October 2016 in a 5–2 win against North Korea.

Career statistics

Club

International

Scores and results list Vietnam's goal tally first, score column indicates score after each Thanh goal.

Honours
Vietnam U23/Olympic
AFC U-23 Championship runner-up: 2018
Asian Games fourth place: 2018
VFF Cup: 2018

Vietnam
VFF Cup: 2022
King's Cup runner-up: 2019
AFF Championship runners-up: 2022 
Individual
Vietnamese Young Player of the Year: 2016
V.League 1 Team of the Season: 2017, 2018

References

1996 births
Living people
People from Hải Dương province
Vietnamese footballers
Association football wingers
Association football fullbacks
V.League 1 players
Hoang Anh Gia Lai FC players
Vietnam youth international footballers
Vietnam international footballers
Footballers at the 2018 Asian Games